Colonel John Shakespear  (1 September 1861, Indore – 1942) was an officer of the British Army in India, an Indian Political Service officer, and an author. He was the youngest of the three sons of Sir Richmond Shakespear.

After education at Wellington College, Berkshire and the Royal Military College, Sandhurst, Shakespear was commissioned into the Prince of Wales's Leinster Regiment (Royal Canadians) on 22 July 1881 as a 2nd lieutenant and was promoted to lieutenant on 1 July 1881.

He was an intelligence officer for the Lushai Expeditionary Force in 1888. He served with the Chin-Lushai Expedition of 1889-90 and was awarded the DSO in 1890. He served at Lushai in 1892 and was in command of the force that took part in the operations in the South Lushai Hills. He was promoted to major in 1895 and was appointed CIE in 1896. He served from 1891 to 1896 as Superintendent of the South Lushai Hills. He was appointed Assistant Commissioner, Assam in 1896 and Deputy Commissioner, Assam in 1897. He served as Political Agent in Manipur from 1905 to 1917. He was appointed CMG in 1917.

Shakespear married in 1892. He was keenly interested in the custody of his father's papers and in the history of the Shakespear family. John Shakespear left notes on the state of Manipur and its royal family and some draft chapters of his autobiography.

Selected publications

References

1861 births
1942 deaths
Military personnel of British India
People educated at Wellington College, Berkshire
Graduates of the Royal Military College, Sandhurst
Indian Political Service officers
British people in colonial India
Prince of Wales's Leinster Regiment officers
Companions of the Order of St Michael and St George
Companions of the Order of the Indian Empire